High House may refer to:

in England
Ancient High House, Stafford
High House, Purfleet

in the United States
High House (Denver, Colorado), a Denver Landmark
 High House (Delaware, Ohio), listed on the National Register of Historic Places in Delaware County
 High House (Paris, Texas), listed on the National Register of Historic Places in Lamar County